Hanamapur is a village in Gokak taluk, Belgaum district in the southern state of Karnataka, India.  the 2011 Census of India, it had a population of 863 people across 167 households.

References

Villages in Belagavi district